is a railway station on the Rikuu East Line in the city of  Ōsaki, Miyagi Prefecture, Japan, operated by East Japan Railway Company (JR East).

Lines
Iwadeyama Station is served by the Rikuu East Line, and is located 24.8 rail kilometers from the terminus of the line at Kogota Station.

Station layout
Iwadeyama Station has one island platform, connected to the station building by a level crossing. The station is staffed.

Platforms

History
Iwadeyama Station opened on 20 April 1913. The station was absorbed into the JR East network upon the privatization of JNR on 1 April 1987.

Passenger statistics
In fiscal 2016, the station was used by an average of 210 passengers daily (boarding passengers only).

Surrounding area
Japan National Route 47
Yūbikan
 Site of Iwadeyama Castle

See also
 List of Railway Stations in Japan

References

External links

  

Railway stations in Miyagi Prefecture
Rikuu East Line
Railway stations in Japan opened in 1913
Ōsaki, Miyagi
Stations of East Japan Railway Company